Simone Stortoni (born 7 July 1985) is an Italian former professional road bicycle racer, who rode professionally between 2009 and 2015 for the , ,  and  teams.

Career
Born in Chiaravalle, Stortoni competed as a professional from the start of the 2009 season, competing for the  team until the end of 2011, when he joined the  squad for the 2012 season.

Stortoni competed in six Grand Tour events during his career, contesting the Giro d'Italia four times, the Tour de France in 2012 and the Vuelta a España in 2013. At his first Giro in 2010, Stortoni finished second during stage eight, after being the closest challenger to Chris Anker Sørensen on the climb to Monte Terminillo.

Major results

2005
 3rd GP Città di Felino
 4th Trofeo Città di Brescia
 4th GP Capodarco
2006
 1st Cronoscalata Gardone Valtrompia
 3rd Parma–La Spezia
 3rd Memorial Danilo Furlan
 3rd Caduti di Soprazocco
 6th Trofeo Alcide Degasperi
 8th Giro del Canavese
 9th GP Capodarco
 9th Coppa Colli Briantei
2007
 1st Giro del Belvedere
 1st GP Comune di Cerreto Guidi
 1st La Bolghera
 2nd Firenze–Modena
 3rd Overall Giro del Friuli-Venezia Giulia
 3rd Coppa 29 Martiri di Figline di Prato
 3rd Gran Premio Industria Commercio Artigianato – Casini
 3rd G.P. Chianti Castello Guicciardini di Poppiano
 5th Trofeo FPT Tapparo
 6th Overall Giro della Toscana
2008
 1st Gran Premio Industrie del Marmo
 1st Memorial Pigoni & Coli
 1st Gran Premio Industria Commercio Artigianato – Botticino
 1st Trofeo FPT Tapparo
 2nd Caduti di Soprazocco
 2nd Trofeo Alta Valle Del Tevere
 3rd GP Enel Monte Amiata
 5th Gran Premio Industria Commercio Artigianato – Casini
 5th Gran Premio Città di Empoli
2010
 6th Gran Premio di Lugano
 9th Coppa Sabatini
2011
 2nd Overall Settimana Ciclistica Lombarda
 2nd Gran Premio Città di Camaiore
 7th Overall Giro di Padania
 8th Tre Valli Varesine
2012
 6th Giro del Veneto
 8th Overall Tour of Norway
2013
 7th Grand Prix of Aargau Canton
2015
 8th Overall Settimana Internazionale di Coppi e Bartali
 9th Overall Tour of Slovenia

Grand Tour general classification results timeline

References

External links

Lampre-ISD profile

Cycling Quotient profile

Italian male cyclists
1985 births
Living people
Sportspeople from the Province of Ancona
Cyclists from Marche